Dmitri Aleksandrovich Maskayev (born 27 December 1987) is a Russian former professional football player.

Club career
He made his Russian Football National League debut for FC Torpedo Moscow on 17 May 2011 in a game against FC Khimki.

External links
 
 Career summary by sportbox.ru

1987 births
Sportspeople from Samara, Russia
Living people
Russian people of Abkhazian descent
Russian footballers
FC Tyumen players
FC Torpedo Moscow players
FC Luch Vladivostok players
FC Lada-Tolyatti players
FC KAMAZ Naberezhnye Chelny players
Association football midfielders
PFC Krylia Sovetov Samara players